KNDI is a radio station located in Honolulu, Hawaii. The station is owned by Geronimo and Nellie Malabed, through licensee Geronimo Broadcasting, LLC, and offers a multicultural format, broadcasting at 1270. Its on-air liners are "Voices from Around the World" and has been on the air since 1960. It was also Hawaii's first radio station to have an all-female airstaff, hence the KNDI calls, which phonetically spells out "Candy." KNDI features programming in Philippine languages (Ilocano and Tagalog), Chinese (Cantonese and Mandarin), Okinawan, Vietnamese, Lao, Spanish, Samoan, Tongan, Marshallese, Chuukese, Pohnpeian and English.

Gallery

External links
FCC History Cards for KNDI
 

1960 establishments in Hawaii
Asian-American culture in Honolulu
Cantonese-language radio stations
Chinese-American culture in Honolulu
Chinese-language radio stations in the United States
Filipino-American culture in Honolulu
Filipino-language radio stations
Filipino-language mass media
NDI
Hispanic and Latino American culture in Hawaii
Ilocano language
Japanese-American culture in Honolulu
Laotian-American culture
Mandarin-language radio stations
Marshallese American
Marshallese language
Micronesian American
Multiculturalism in the United States
Pacific Islands-American culture in Honolulu
Radio stations established in 1960
NDI
Ryukyuan languages
Samoan American
Samoan language
Spanish-language radio stations in the United States
Tongan American
Tongic languages
NDI